Body and Soul is a 1947 American film noir sports drama directed by Robert Rossen and starring John Garfield, Lilli Palmer, Hazel Brooks, Anne Revere, and William Conrad.  The screenplay by Abraham Polonsky is partly based on the 1939 film Golden Boy. With cinematography by James Wong Howe, the film is considered by some to be one of the best films about boxing. It is also a cautionary tale about the lure of money—and how it can derail even a strong common man in his pursuit of success. The film uses the song Body and Soul for the main musical theme and underscoring throughout.

Premise
Charley Davis, against the wishes of his mother, becomes a boxer.  As he becomes more successful the fighter becomes surrounded by shady characters, including an unethical promoter named Roberts, who tempts the man with a number of vices.  Charley finds himself faced with increasingly difficult choices.

When talented fighter Ben Chaplin finds himself blacklisted from a title shot because of his race, Davis hires him as a well-paid sparring partner. Davis begins to have a moral awakening when Chaplin has a seizure and dies in the training camp ring.

Davis finds the moral courage to win a title fight that he was supposed to throw and shrugs off Roberts' post-fight threats.

Cast
 John Garfield as Charley Davis
 Lilli Palmer as Peg Born
 Hazel Brooks as Alice
 Anne Revere as Anna Davis
 William Conrad as Quinn
 Joseph Pevney as Shorty Polaski
 Lloyd Gough as Roberts
 Canada Lee as Ben Chaplin
 Art Smith as David Davis
 Larry Steers as Fight Spectator (uncredited)

Reception

Critical response
When the film was released, critic Bosley Crowther praised the film, writing, "Body and Soul has up and done it, with interest and excitement to spare, and we heartily recommend it in its present exhibition at the Globe ... Still [Abraham Polonsky has] written his story with such flavor and such slashing fidelity to the cold and greedy nature of the fight game, and Robert Rossen has directed it with such an honest regard for human feelings and with such a searching and seeing camera, that any possible resemblance to other fight yarns, living or dead, may be gratefully allowed."

Film critic Dennis Schwartz discussed that the film had a definite sociopolitical point of view and praised Garfield's work. He, wrote, "Robert Rossen's Body and Soul becomes more than a boxing and film noir tale, as screenwriter Abraham Polonsky makes this into a socialist morality drama where the pursuit of money becomes the focus that derails the common man in his quest for success ... Garfield is seen as a victim of the ruthless capitalistic system that fixes everything including athletic events, as the little guy is always at the mercy of the big operator. It's the kind of liberalism that was common in the dramas made in the 1930s. It's more a film about corruption and the presence of violence everywhere in America rather than a straight boxing film ... Body and Soul viewed at this late date lacks much relevancy and now only seems gripping because of Garfield's gritty performance, and not because of the intense script that once made waves in powerful circles.

TV Guide comments: "The fight sequences, in particular, brought a kind of realism to the genre that had never before existed (James Wong Howe wore skates and rolled around the ring shooting the fight scenes with a hand-held camera). A knockout on all levels."

Accolades
Francis Lyon and Robert Parrish won the Academy Award for Best Film Editing. John Garfield was nominated for Best Actor in a Leading Role, and Abraham Polonsky was nominated for Best Writing, Original Screenplay. The film was voted as the Greatest Boxing Movie Ever in 2014 by the Houston Boxing Hall Of Fame.

The film is recognized by American Film Institute in these lists:
 2008: AFI's 10 Top 10:
 Nominated Sports Film

References

External links
 
 
 
 
 

1947 films
1940s sports drama films
American sports drama films
American black-and-white films
American boxing films
1940s English-language films
Film noir
Films directed by Robert Rossen
Films scored by Hugo Friedhofer
Films whose editor won the Best Film Editing Academy Award
United Artists films
1947 drama films
1940s American films